Bastian Swillims (born 9 December 1982) is a German sprinter who specialises in the 400 metres. He was born in Dortmund.

His personal best time is 45.44 seconds, achieved in August 2007 in Osaka.

Achievements

External links 
 

1982 births
Living people
Sportspeople from Dortmund
German male sprinters
German national athletics champions
Athletes (track and field) at the 2004 Summer Olympics
Athletes (track and field) at the 2008 Summer Olympics
Olympic athletes of Germany
20th-century German people
21st-century German people